The 2009–10 Premier League (known as the Barclays Premier League for sponsorship reasons) was the 18th season of the Premier League since its establishment in 1992. A total of 20 teams competed in the league, with Chelsea unseating the three-time defending champions Manchester United, scoring a then Premier League record 103 goals in the process. The season began on 15 August 2009 and concluded on 9 May 2010. Prior to each opening week match, a minute's applause was held in memory of Sir Bobby Robson. Nike provided a new match ball – the T90 Ascente – for this season. Barclays sponsored the league.

The race for the title went to the final day of the season with Chelsea one point ahead of Manchester United; Chelsea's 8–0 win over Wigan Athletic was enough to secure their first title since 2006, despite Manchester United's 4–0 defeat of Stoke City. The title win came in Chelsea manager Carlo Ancelotti's first season at the club and he followed this up a week later by securing Chelsea's first FA Cup and League double with a win over Portsmouth at Wembley. Chelsea striker Didier Drogba won the Golden Boot award as the league's top goalscorer for the second time The victorious Chelsea side were noted for their attacking style of football: the team averaged 2.71 goals per game, scoring a Premier League record 103 goals for the season, compared to the average of 1.89 when they won the title in the 2004–05 and 2005–06 seasons.

In February 2010, Portsmouth became the first club to go into administration whilst a member of the Premier League. They were docked nine points, and two months later they were the first team of the season to be relegated. Hull City and Premier League debutants Burnley were relegated alongside them.

Overview

Pre-season
Pre-season was overshadowed by the death of Sir Bobby Robson on 31 July. On the opening games of the season, players stood around the centre circle for a minute's applause for the former Newcastle United, Fulham, Ipswich Town, Barcelona, Porto, PSV and England manager who died at the age of 76.

Broadcasting

This season was the last of a three-year domestic television rights deal agreed in 2006. Television rights continue to provide a large portion of Premier League clubs' revenue. However, on 19 June 2009, the Premier League annulled its contract with Ireland-based broadcaster Setanta Sports after the company failed to pay an instalment to the league with speculation mounting that the company would enter administration. As a result, Setanta Sports' share was bought by United States-based broadcasters ESPN, while Sky Sports continue to hold four of the six 23-live match packages. In the United States, the Disney-owned network is making use of sibling-network ESPN2 to televise early Saturday matches and Monday matches. This was possible due to Setanta Sports' financial troubles, which required their USA-based North America division to sell its rights to those games back to Fox Sports International, who in turn sublicensed them to ESPN. Setanta continues to broadcast a reduced number of matches in Ireland. In Australia, most games are available live on Fox Sports. Sentanta Sports USA operations ceased on 28 February, and Fox Soccer Plus replaced Sentanta as a pay service the following day.

On 31 January 2010, Sky Sports broadcast the match between Arsenal and Manchester United in 3D. The 3D broadcast was shown at nine pubs in London, Manchester, Cardiff, Edinburgh and Dublin, making the match the first sports event to be televised in 3D to a public audience anywhere in the world.

List of 2009–10 transfers

Final results
Chelsea won the league by a point over second placed Manchester United on 9 May 2010, with an 8–0 win at home to Wigan Athletic. They won despite Manchester United's 4–0 win against Stoke. The title win came in Chelsea manager Carlo Ancelotti's first season with the club. Portsmouth were the first team to be relegated on 10 April 2010, followed by Hull City and Burnley. Fulham's manager Roy Hodgson was voted manager of the year by the League Managers Association. The season saw Liverpool, runners-up the previous season and considered one of the established 'Big Four', finish outside the top four for the first time since 2004–05 leaving them unable to compete in the UEFA Champions League for the first time since the 2003–04 season. Tottenham Hotspur finished with their best point total at the time in the Premier League era, finishing in fourth place on 70 points, earning their first ever berth into the Champions league.

Teams
Twenty teams competed in the league – the top seventeen teams from the previous season and the three teams promoted from the Championship. The promoted teams were Wolverhampton Wanderers, Birmingham City and Burnley returning to the top flight after absences of five, one and thirty-three years respectively. This was also Burnley's first season in the Premier League. They replaced Newcastle United, Middlesbrough and West Bromwich Albion, relegated from the top flight after sixteen, eleven and one year respectively.

Stadiums and locations

Personnel and kits
(as of 9 May 2010)

* – Football Management Consultant

Managerial changes

League table

Results

Season statistics

Scoring
First goal of the season: 27 minutes and 12 seconds – Stephen Hunt for Hull City against Chelsea (15 August 2009)
Fastest goal in a match: 36 seconds – Darren Bent for Sunderland against Tottenham Hotspur (3 April 2010)
Goal scored at the latest point in a match: 90+5 minutes and 48 seconds – Wade Elliott for Burnley against Hull City (10 April 2010)
First own goal of the season: Stephen Jordan (Burnley) for Stoke City, 32 minutes and 28 seconds (15 August 2009)
First hat-trick of the season: Jermain Defoe (Tottenham Hotspur) against Hull City (19 August 2009)
 Quickest hat-trick: 6 minutes – Jermain Defoe (Tottenham Hotspur) against Wigan Athletic (22 November 2009)
Widest winning margin: 8 goals
Tottenham Hotspur 9–1 Wigan Athletic (22 November 2009)
Chelsea 8–0 Wigan Athletic (9 May 2010)
Most goals in one half: 9 goals – Tottenham Hotspur 9–1 Wigan Athletic (1–0 at half time) (22 November 2009)
Most goals in one half by a single team: 8 goals – Tottenham Hotspur 9–1 Wigan Athletic (22 November 2009)
Most goals scored by losing team: 3 goals –
Manchester United 4–3 Manchester City (20 September 2009)
West Ham United 5–3 Burnley (28 November 2009)
Manchester City 4–3 Sunderland (19 December 2009)
Most goals scored in a match by one player: 5 goals – Jermain Defoe for Tottenham Hotspur against Wigan Athletic (22 November 2009)
Shortest time between goals: 50 seconds – Robin van Persie (41'52") and Cesc Fàbregas (42'42") for Arsenal against Tottenham Hotspur (31 October 2009)
Most own goals scored in a match by same team: 3 – Portsmouth (Anthony Vanden Borre, Richard Hughes and Marc Wilson) against Manchester United (6 February 2010) However, on 26 May 2010, the Dubious Goal Committee declared the second own goal by Richard Hughes as Michael Carrick's goal.
 Last goal of the season: Diniyar Bilyaletdinov (Everton) against Portsmouth 93 minutes and 10 seconds (9 May 2010)
 Fewest times failed to score: 1 game – Chelsea against Birmingham
 Most times failed to score: 17 games – Wolverhampton Wanderers
 Highest scoring draw: 6 goals:
 Bolton 3–3 Manchester City
 Chelsea 3–3 Everton
 Hull City 3–3 West Ham
 Manchester City 3–3 Burnley

Top scorers

Most assists

Table-related statistics

Overall
Most wins – Chelsea and Manchester United (27)
Fewest wins – Hull City (6)
Most losses – Burnley and Portsmouth (24)
Fewest losses – Chelsea (6)
Most goals scored – Chelsea (103)
Fewest goals scored – Wolverhampton Wanderers (32)
Most goals conceded – Burnley (82)
Fewest goals conceded – Manchester United (28)
Best goal difference – Chelsea (+71)
Worst goal difference – Wigan Athletic (−42)

Home
Most wins – Chelsea (17)
Fewest wins – Portsmouth and Wolverhampton Wanderers (5)
Most losses – Portsmouth (11)
Fewest losses – Chelsea (1)
Most goals scored – Chelsea (68)
Fewest goals scored – Wolverhampton Wanderers (13)
Most goals conceded – Portsmouth (32)
Fewest goals conceded – Manchester United and Tottenham Hotspur (12)

Away
Most wins – Manchester United (11)
Fewest wins – Hull City (0)
Most losses – Burnley (17)
Fewest losses – Manchester City (4)
Most goals scored – Arsenal and Chelsea (35)
Fewest goals scored – Portsmouth and Stoke City (10)
Most goals conceded – Wigan Athletic (55)
Fewest goals conceded – Manchester United (16)

Clean sheets
Most clean sheets – Manchester United (19)
Fewest clean sheets – Burnley (3)

Discipline
First yellow card of the season: Bernard Mendy for Hull City against Chelsea, 45+1 minute and 30 seconds (15 August 2009)
First red card of the season: Sean Davis for Bolton Wanderers against Liverpool, 53 minutes and 57 seconds (29 August 2009)
Card given at latest point in a game: Barry Ferguson (red) at 90+5 minutes and 27 seconds for Birmingham City against Manchester City (1 November 2009)
Most yellow cards in a single match: 9
Manchester United 2–1 Arsenal – 3 for Manchester United (Wes Brown, Patrice Evra and Wayne Rooney) and 6 for Arsenal (Manuel Almunia, Bacary Sagna, William Gallas, Emmanuel Eboué, Alex Song, and Robin van Persie) (29 August 2009);
Sunderland 1–1 Wigan Athletic – 4 for Sunderland (Lorik Cana, Lee Cattermole, Kenwyne Jones and George McCartney) and 5 for Wigan (Gary Caldwell, Maynor Figueroa, James McCarthy, Charles N'Zogbia and Hugo Rodallega) (6 February 2010)
Most red cards in a single match: 3 – Portsmouth 1–1 Sunderland – 1 for Portsmouth (Ricardo Rocha) and 2 for Sunderland (Lee Cattermole and David Meyler) (9 February 2010)

Miscellaneous
Longest first half injury time: 8 minutes, 26 seconds – Stoke City against Chelsea (12 September 2009)
Longest second half injury time: 10 minutes, 25 seconds – Hull City against Aston Villa (21 April 2010)
Worst start to a Premier League season: 0 points from 7 games – Portsmouth (26 September 2009). Losing streak ended on 3 October 2009, with 1–0 victory over Wolverhampton Wanderers
Most own goals in a season for a single team: 10 – Manchester United

Records
Chelsea broke the record for most goals scored in a season with 103 goals, becoming the first Premier League club to cross the century mark. The previous record of 97 goals was set by Manchester United in the 1999–2000 season. The Blues also broke the record for the highest goal difference in a season with +71 goals. The previous record of +58 goals was set by Manchester United in the 2007–08 campaign. United equalled their own previous record during the 2009–10 campaign.
Wigan Athletic were the first team to lose two matches by eight goals in a Premier League season, away to Tottenham Hotspur and Chelsea.
 Chelsea scored seven or more goals in four league matches, a record for both the club and the Premier League, and in consecutive home fixtures achieved an aggregate score of 15–0, in their last two home matches of the season against Stoke City and Wigan Athletic, having already scored seven in home matches against Sunderland and Aston Villa.

Awards

Monthly awards

Annual awards

Premier League Manager of the Season
Harry Redknapp, 63, received the Premier League Manager of the Season for the first time in his career, as a result of leading Tottenham Hotspur to Champions League qualification. Redknapp winning Manager of the Season marked the first time a non-title winning manager received the award since George Burley in the 2000–01 Premier League season.

Premier League Player of the Season
The Premier League Player of the Season award was won by Wayne Rooney of Manchester United.

PFA Players' Player of the Year
The PFA Players' Player of the Year was awarded to Wayne Rooney.

The shortlist for the PFA Players' Player of the Year award, in alphabetical order, was as follows:
Didier Drogba (Chelsea)
Cesc Fàbregas (Arsenal)
Wayne Rooney (Manchester United)
Carlos Tevez (Manchester City)

PFA Team of the Year

PFA Young Player of the Year
The PFA Young Player of the Year was awarded to James Milner for the first time.

Premier League Golden Boot
Chelsea striker Didier Drogba won the Premier League Golden Boot award, scoring 29 goals in 32 appearances; this was the second time he won the award.

Premier League Fair Play Award
The Premier League Fair Play Award was given to Arsenal, the team deemed to have been the most sporting and best behaved. Sunderland occupied last place as the least sporting side

Behaviour of The Public Fair Play League
The Public Fair Play League was again given to Fulham for the third consecutive year.

Premier League Merit Award
Chelsea collected the Premier League Merit Award for being the first team to score 100 goals in a Premier League season.

References

 
Premier League seasons
Eng
1